The Episcopal Diocese of Long Island is the diocese of the Episcopal Church in the United States of America with jurisdiction over the counties of Kings, Queens, Nassau and Suffolk, which comprise Long Island, New York. It is in Province 2 and its cathedral, the Cathedral of the Incarnation, is located in Garden City, as are its diocesan offices.

Current bishop
On the Feast of Theodore of Tarsus, September 19, 2009, Lawrence C. Provenzano was ordained and consecrated as Bishop Coadjutor of the Episcopal Diocese of Long Island. He officially took office as Bishop of Long Island at the Diocesan Convention November 14, 2009, and was seated at the Cathedral of the Incarnation on November 22, 2009.

List of bishops
The bishops of Long Island have been:

1. Abram Newkirk Littlejohn, (1868–1901)
2. Frederick Burgess, (1901–1925)
3. Ernest M. Stires, (1925–1942)
 Frank W. Creighton, suffragan bishop (1933–1937), II Missionary Bishop of the Diocese of Mexico (1926-1933), VI Bishop of the Episcopal Diocese of Michigan (1926-1946)
 John Insley Blair Larned, suffragan bishop (1929-1946)
4. James P. deWolfe, (1942–1966)
  Jonathan G. Sherman, suffragan bishop (1949-1965)
5. Jonathan G. Sherman, (1966–1977)
 Charles W. MacLean, suffragan bishop (1963-1975)
 Richard Beamon Martin, suffragan bishop (1967-1974)
6. Robert C. Witcher, (1977–1991)
 C. Shannon Mallory , assisting bishop (1979-1980)
 Henry B. Hucles III, suffragan bishop (1981-1988)
 Orris George Walker, coadjutor (1988-1991)
7. Orris George Walker, (1991–2009 )
 Rodney R. Michel, suffragan bishop (1997-2007)
 David Joslin as Apostolic Administrator  (2009)
 Lawrence C. Provenzano, coadjutor (2009)
8. Lawrence C. Provenzano, bishop (2009–present)
Chilton R. Knudsen, assistant bishop (2014-2015)
 Geralyn Wolf, assisting bishop (2015-2016), assistant bishop (2016-present)
 R. William Franklin, assisting bishop (2019- present)

History of the Diocese

The Diocese has benefited from large endowments, for example, $10,000 given in 1908 by Roslyn, New York resident John Ordronaux.

See also

 List of bishops of the Episcopal Church in the United States of America

References

External links
 
 Cathedral of the Incarnation website
Official Web site of the Episcopal Church
Diocese of Long Island Bishop Coadjutor Search & Diocesan Profile
- Map of The Church in The Diocese of Long Island
Journal of the Annual Convention, Diocese of Long Island

1868 establishments in New York (state)
Anglican dioceses established in the 19th century
Christianity in New York City
Long Island
 
Episcopal Church in New York (state)
Province 2 of the Episcopal Church (United States)
Religious organizations established in 1868